Terror in the Family is a 1996 American television film directed by Gregory Goodell and starring Joanna Kerns, Dan Lauria, Andrew Kavovit, Adam Hendershott, Nan Martin, Beau Billingslea, Ryan Christopher Mouritsen, Kathleen Wilhoite, and Hilary Swank. The film is about parents' struggle with the raising of their teenage daughter whose rebellious temperament erupts into violence. Filming took place in Utah.

Plot 
Deena Marten is a 15-year-old high school student living in Washington state, who has become a rebel since dating Garret Lexau, a senior who was suspended from school for hitting a teacher. Deena no longer keeps any of her promises, skips school and leaves the family home whenever she pleases. Her attitude and the breakdown of their formerly close relationship distresses her mother, Cynthia. The family appears perfect on the surface, but both children know their father, Todd, didn't want to have them. He is distant, preferring his sideline of manufacturing wooden bowls to spending time with Cynthia, who drinks too much and has turned to Deena for companionship. Deena's brother Adam forges school notes for her in addition to persuading Cynthia not to spy on her daughter's activities. He also acts as a surrogate for his father, watching movies with Cynthia until she falls asleep on the sofa.

Cynthia's relationship with her alcoholic mother is also dysfunctional. Her mother is resentful that her other daughter, Judith, doesn't speak to her. She criticizes Cynthia's parenting, advising her to be stricter with Deena and smack her if she refuses to obey. Rather than confront Deena over cleaning her room, Cynthia does it herself, which enrages Deena; she reacts violently, pushing her mother before fleeing the house. Adam begins drinking alcohol in order to cope with the stress within the family. Deena makes up with a drunken Cynthia, who insists they watch a film together, but their improved relationship tanks the next day when a letter from school notifies Cynthia that Deena has been skipping school. The confrontation turns violent, with Deena slapping Cynthia hard enough to bloody her lip. Todd ineffectually tries to parent Deena, guilting her into apologizing to Cynthia, who hides the real reason for the argument from him. Although she admitted to Garret that she liked hitting her mother, Deena apologizes and while she admits she skipped school, she lies and claims that she wasn't with Garret. She then asks Cynthia to continue to hide her truancy from her father and cover for her absence at school.

Cynthia agrees to lie for her, but she soon has another setback when the principal informs her Deena has been kicked off the swim team and watches Deena lie to him about possibly having mono. Todd announces that there are going to be changes in the house to put an end to Deena's rebellious behavior. Todd is furious with Cynthia, blaming the situation on her ineffectual parenting and drinking. Announcing new changes, he gives Deena an after-school curfew and list of chores. Deena agrees, then goes upstairs and has sex with Garret, who has snuck in through her bedroom window. The next day Todd demonstrates to Cynthia how effective his approach is, informing her that Deena went to class, and that he's obtained all her missing assignments and done some research about Garret. Cynthia defiantly tells him that he can tell Deena when she finally gets home, as she isn't back from school and hasn't called. Todd grills Adam as to Garret's whereabouts, blaming him for lying to his mother. Deena, who is out with Garret, calls Todd and claims she has merely been complying with his "list" and has been doing homework with a friend. In response to Deena's manipulation, Todd ends up bargaining with her what time she will return home. Cynthia immediately calls the parents of the friend who Deena claimed she was with, proving that Deena has lied to Todd and that he is just as ineffective a parent as she is. When Todd insists on seeing Deena's supposedly completed homework when she gets home, she erupts violently and slams her bedroom door on his hand, breaking his fingers. Deena recklessly climbs the local radio tower, saying she can't go back home, but Garret convinces her to run away to California with him when the weather is warmer for hitchhiking.

Meanwhile, Cynthia and Todd have no idea what to do about Deena. When they find marijuana and tests with failing grades in her bedroom, Todd grounds her, telling her he is removing her stereo and phone and forbidding her from seeing Garret again. Threatening to call the police if she doesn't comply, Deena responds by threatening Todd that she'll tell the police she acted in self-defense and that he tried to rape her. While Deena has Adam deliver a note to Garret telling him she wants to run away now, Cynthia starts undermining Todd's decisions, making snacks for Deena and asking Todd to return her stereo. Todd initially refuses until Deena has completed her missing schoolwork, but relents when Cynthia starts to open a bottle of wine. Deena sneaks out again to see Garret, who reveals he got into a violent confrontation with his mother and a man she brought home, so he has decided to leave town immediately, telling Deena to pack up and meet him. Deena is caught sneaking in and her parents react furiously, which results in Deena hitting her mother with a phone and threatening to stab her father. Adam calls the police, who arrest Deena, over the protests of her parents, who are convinced that "drugs" are to blame, and that she should be taken to the hospital and treated. As Deena is put in the police car she sees an incredulous Garret, with his backpack, among the spectators. Although her parents attempt to withdraw the charges, Deena is released into her aunt Judith's custody, put on probation for 6 weeks, ordered to have no contact with her parents and to visit a therapist.

When Deena questions where her impulse to strike Cynthia came from because she was never even spanked, Judith tells her that when she and Cynthia were children, their mother hit them, and Cynthia went to the other extreme. Cynthia, who has been drinking, calls and asks Deena where she went wrong because they were "best friends," and that she tried hard to be a good mother. When Deena doesn't respond to Cynthia's claim that she's the only one she has to talk to, Cynthia resentfully tells her she is sorry that she called. She continues to drink and phone Deena, who refuses her calls, asking Judith why someone else couldn't have the responsibility.

Cynthia immediately makes plans to meet with Deena as she doesn't want to see her with a therapist, claiming it will make things worse. She fears Deena will make herself to be the victim, blaming her for her alcoholism and accusing Todd of rape. When her mother blames Cynthia's "pathetic" method of parenting, she blames her for her treatment of herself and Judith, which prompts her mother to slap her. After drinking too much and preparing homemade pizza, she goes to Judith's house.  When Deena tells her she's not supposed to be there, she drunkenly drops the pizza, calling her ungrateful, claiming she is just like Judith, who she blames for leaving her with the responsibility of caring for their mother. Deena runs out of the house and tries to find comfort with Garret, only to find him with another girl. When Judith visits Cynthia to tell her that Deena has returned home, she tells her that her behavior is the same as their alcoholic mother's. Cynthia denies it, stating that a bad mother couldn't have terrific kids, and that Deena was a wonderful child until she met Garret. When she insists that Adam validate her, she finds him drunk with an empty bottle of liquor in his bed. When Cynthia tries to tell Judith and Todd they should talk in the morning, Adam stumbles down the stairs after her. She tries to get him to return to bed to hide his drinking problem, but he shoves her into the wall, hard enough to break the glass in a family photo. As she tries to get Todd to tell Judith this has never happened before, he retreats into the basement with his woodwork. He tells her he has seen Adam drunk on two previous occasions and that he didn't tell her because it would prompt her to drink. While Cynthia blames Todd for being an absentee husband and father who turned to woodworking when Deena was born, Todd blames her for letting Deena take control of the family and capitulating every time she became angry, afraid to lose what she saw as her only friend. As he leaves and turns out the light, Todd resolves to start therapy with Adam and Deena, leaving Cynthia, who refuses to admit she is an alcoholic, literally in the dark.

En route by bus to therapy, Garret tells Deena that his previous girlfriend had pursued him, and he'd only had sex with her to make sure the relationship was still over. She is surprised to see her father and Adam at the center, and tells Garret she can't miss the session. Todd tells them he wishes Cynthia would show up, that he's there because he wants things to change, and that he loves them both. Cynthia arrives just as the session starts.

Garret is at Deena's hearing, when the judge excuses any jail time, but still puts her on a year's probation with community service and anger management classes. He expects her to go to California with him, and when she tells him that things have changed, that Cynthia is in a treatment program and that her father and brother need her help, he reacts angrily to her rejection and nearly slaps her before stalking off. The film ends with Deena being reunited with her parents and younger brother.

Cast
 Joanna Kerns as Cynthia Marten
 Dan Lauria as Todd Marten
 Hilary Swank as Deena Marten
 Andrew Kavovit as Garret Lexau
 Adam Hendershott as Adam Marten
 Nan Martin as Ivy
 Beau Billingslea as Judge Roubal
 Kathleen Wilhoite as Judith

References

External links

1996 television films
1996 films
1990s teen drama films
American teen drama films
Fox network original films
1990s English-language films
1990s American films